Subodh Public School is a senior secondary English medium co-educational school in Jaipur, Rajasthan, India. It is affiliated to the Central Board of Secondary Education (CBSE). The school started in 1985 under the aegis of Shri S.S. Jain Subodh Shiksha Samiti. It has a population of 3,500 students and 200 teachers. The students are prepared to write the CBSE examination in Science, Commerce, and Humanities. The principal of the school is Mrs. Kamaljeet Yadav.

Description
Subodh Public School was the first school in Rajasthan to be certified with an ISO Quality management system and Environmental Management System. It was among the first five schools of India to be certified with an International School Award as a pioneer for the pilot project launched by British Council U.K. The school has consecutively won the International School Award.
 First in Rajasthan selected by the British Council for the DFID Global Curriculum Development Project
 First school of the country to establish the Human Rights Club
 First in the country to launch No Bag No Books system for primary classes
 First in the country to implement Teacher Appraisal System
 First to launch Open Book system in the junior classes
 First to implement 100 plus system in the home examination
 First to start with water management with roof-top rain-water harvesting system and raising of the ground water level system

External links

Schools in Jaipur
1985 establishments in Rajasthan
Educational institutions established in 1985